Heteroclinus equiradiatus, the Sevenbar weedfish, is a species of clinid native to the Indian Ocean coast of western Australia.  This species can reach a maximum length of  TL.

References

equiradiatus
Fish described in 1960